Heresy is the second album by German thrash metal band Paradox, released in 1989. The album preaches a conceptual story about the Albigensian Crusade of the 13th century. It is Paradox's best selling album to date, and was the band's last studio album for 11 years, until Collision Course (2000).

Heresy was reissued by the German label High Vaultage Records in 1999, which contains two bonus tracks. The album was reissued again on 13 August 2007 by Metal Mind Productions from Poland as a digipak on golden disc, featuring bonus tracks, digitally remastered using 24-bit process and limited to 2,000 copies.

Track listing

Personnel 
 Charly Steinhauer – vocals, guitar
 Markus Spyth – guitar
 Matthias "K.ter" Fries (Schmitt) – bass
 Axel Blaha – drums

References 

1989 albums
Paradox (German band) albums
Concept albums
Roadrunner Records albums